Tether (often referred to by its currency codes, USD₮ and USDT, among others) is an asset-backed cryptocurrency stablecoin. It was launched by the company Tether Limited Inc. in 2014. Tether Limited is owned by the Hong Kong-based company iFinex Inc., which also owns the Bitfinex cryptocurrency exchange. As of July 2022, Tether Limited has minted the USDT stablecoin on ten protocols and blockchains. Tether is described as a stablecoin because it was originally designed to be valued at USD $1.00. Tether Limited has stated that it maintains USD $1 of asset reserves for each USD₮ 1 issued, but has been fined by regulators for failing to do this and has failed to present audits showing sufficient asset reserves.

History

Creation 
In 2012, J.R. Willett published a whitepaper which described the possibility of building new cryptocurrencies on top of the Bitcoin blockchain. Willett went on to help implement this idea in the cryptocurrency Mastercoin, which had an associated Mastercoin Foundation (later renamed the Omni Foundation) to promote the use of this new "second layer". The Mastercoin protocol became the technological foundation of the Tether cryptocurrency, and one of the original members of Mastercoin Foundation. Brock Pierce, became a co-founder of Tether. and Tether founder, Craig Sellars, became the CTO of the Mastercoin Foundation.

The precursor to Tether, originally named "Realcoin", was announced in July 2014 by co-founders Brock Pierce, Reeve Collins, and Craig Sellars as a Santa Monica based startup. The first tokens were issued on 6 October 2014, on the Bitcoin blockchain. This was done by using the Omni Layer Protocol. On 20 November 2014, Tether CEO Reeve Collins announced the project was being renamed to "Tether". The company also announced it was entering private beta, which supported a "Tether+ token" for three currencies: USTether (US+) for United States dollars, EuroTether (EU+) for euros and YenTether (JP+) for Japanese yen. Tether said "Every Tether+ token is backed 100% by its original currency, and can be redeemed at any time with no exposure to exchange risk." The company's website states that it is incorporated in Hong Kong with offices in Switzerland, without giving details.

2015–2016 
In January 2015, the cryptocurrency exchange Bitfinex enabled trading of Tether on their platform. While representatives from Tether and Bitfinex say that the two are separate, the Paradise Papers leaks in November 2017 named Bitfinex officials Philip Potter and Giancarlo Devasini as responsible for setting up Tether Holdings Limited in the British Virgin Islands in 2014. A spokesperson for Bitfinex and Tether has said that the CEO of both firms is Jan Ludovicus van der Velde. According to Tether's website, the Hong Kong-based Tether Limited is a fully owned subsidiary of Tether Holdings Limited. Bitfinex is one of the largest Bitcoin exchanges by volume in the world.

For a while, Tether was processing US dollar transactions through Taiwanese banks which, in turn, sent the money through the bank Wells Fargo to allow the funds to move outside Taiwan. Tether announced that on 18 April 2017, these international transfers had been blocked. Along with Bitfinex, Tether filed suit against Wells Fargo in the U.S. District Court for the Northern District of California. The lawsuit was withdrawn a week later.

Tether issues tokens on Bitcoin (Omni and Liquid Protocol), Ethereum, EOS, Tron, Algorand, SLP and -OMG Network blockchains.

Currently, there are a total of five distinct Tether tokens: United States dollar tether on Bitcoin's Omni layer, euro tether on Bitcoin's Omni layer, United States dollar tether as an ERC-20 token, and euro tether as an ERC-20 token, and added in 2020 United States dollar tether as an TRC-20 token on the TRON network.

2017–2018 
From January 2017 to September 2018, the amount of tethers outstanding grew from about $10 million to about $2.8 billion. In early 2018 Tether accounted for about 10% of the trading volume of Bitcoin, but during the summer of 2018 it accounted for up to 80% of Bitcoin volume. Research suggests that a price manipulation scheme involving tether accounted for about half of the price increase in Bitcoin in late 2017. More than $500 million of Tether was issued in August 2018.

On 15 October 2018 the tether price briefly fell to $0.88 due to the perceived credit risk as traders on Bitfinex exchanged tether for Bitcoin, driving up the price of Bitcoin.

The Wall Street Journal reported that in late 2018, Tether Holdings Ltd co-owner Stephen Moore discussed efforts by a major Tether trader in China to “circumvent the banking system by providing fake sales invoices and contracts for each deposit and withdrawal.” The report quoted a Moore email in which he admitted signing these fake invoices and contracts but said he “would not want to argue any of the above in a potential fraud/money laundering case.” Tether released a response calling the Journal report “wholly inaccurate and misleading” but didn't cite any specific inaccuracies.

2019–Present 
In 2019, Tether surpassed Bitcoin in trading volume with the highest daily and monthly trading volume of any cryptocurrency on the market.

Alleged price manipulation

Academic Research 
Research by Griffin and Shams found that Bitcoin prices increased after Tether minted new USD₮ during market downturns. They speculated this was an attempt at market manipulation. These findings were contested by the Bitfinex cryptocurrency exchange who claimed the authors cherry-picked data and lacked a complete dataset. Subsequent researchers found little to no evidence that Tether USD₮ minting events influenced Bitcoin prices, supporting the Bitfinex critique. In 2022, research found that Bitcoin prices only increased when Whale Alert tweeted to the public that Tether had minted USDT, supporting a classic investor response to news announcements. Academic research following the Griffin and Shams study did not conclude that Tether manipulated Bitcoin. The CEO of Tether and Bitfinex commented on the academic debate: "Bitfinex nor Tether is, or has ever, engaged in any sort of market or price manipulation. Tether issuances cannot be used to prop up the price of Bitcoin or any other coin/token on Bitfinex."

Media Research 
Bloomberg News reporters found irregularities on the Kraken cryptocurrency exchange, with small market orders moving the market price of Tether as much as larger market orders from 1 May 2018 to 22 June 2018. New York University Professor Rosa Abrantes-Metz and Federal Reserve bank examiner Mark Williams suggested the unusual order sizes were indicative of wash trading by automated trading programs. The Kraken cryptocurrency exchange offered a rebuttal of these claims, stating that Bloomberg News misunderstood the concept of stablecoin and that the market price of Tether was not greatly influenced by market order size because Tether was a stablecoin pegged to the United States dollar. The user responsible for unusual order sizes also confirmed that the oddly specific order sizes and decimal places were "randomly selected." The Kraken cryptocurrency exchange rebuttal of the Bloomberg News findings were later supported by academic research concerning the stability of stablecoins.

Legal Research 
On 20 November 2018, Bloomberg reported that U.S. federal prosecutors are investigating whether Tether was used to manipulate the price of Bitcoin.

According to Tether's website tether can be newly issued, by purchase for dollars, or redeemed by exchanges and qualified corporate customers excluding U.S.-based customers. Journalist Jon Evans states that he has not been able to find publicly verifiable examples of a purchase of newly issued tether or a redemption in the year ending August 2018.

Security and liquidity 
Tether claims that it intends to hold all United States dollars in reserve so that it can meet customer withdrawals upon demand. It was unable to meet all withdrawal requests in 2017. Tether purports to make reserve account holdings transparent via external audit; however, Tether never produced an audit showing it had the purported reserve. In January 2018 Tether announced that they no longer had a relationship with their auditor.

About $31 million of USDT tokens were stolen from Tether in November 2017. Later analysis of the Bitcoin distributed ledger showed a close connection between the Tether hack and the January 2015 hack of Bitstamp. In response to the theft, Tether suspended trading, and stated it would roll out new software to implement an emergency "hard fork" in order to render all of the tokens that Tether identified as stolen in the heist untradeable. Tether has stated that as of 19 December 2017, it has re-enabled limited cryptocurrency wallet services and has begun processing the backlog of pending trades.

On September 19, 2022, due to an ongoing lawsuit in New York District Court, Bitfinex and Tether (referred to in court records as B/T), were ordered to produce documents showing the backing of USDT, the outcome of which is still pending.

Questions about dollar reserves 
An online critic who goes by the name "Bitfinex'ed" has raised questions about the relationship between Bitfinex and Tether in 2017, accusing Bitfinex of creating "magic Tethers out of thin air". In September 2017, Tether published a memorandum from a public accounting firm that Tether Limited claimed showed that tethers were fully backed by US dollars; however, according to the New York Times, independent attorney Lewis Cohen stated the document, because of the careful way it was phrased, does not prove that the Tether coins are backed by dollars. The documents also fail to ascertain whether the balances in question are otherwise encumbered. The accounting firm specifically stated that

Tether has failed to present audits showing that the amount of tethers outstanding are backed one-to-one by U.S. dollars on deposit despite repeated claims that they would. A June 2018 attempt at an audit was posted on their website in June 2018 which showed a report by the law firm Freeh, Sporkin & Sullivan LLP (FSS) which appeared to confirm that the issued tethers were fully backed by dollars. However, FSS stated "FSS is not an accounting firm and did not perform the above review and confirmations using Generally Accepted Accounting Principles," and "The above confirmation of bank and tether balances should not be construed as the results of an audit and were not conducted in accordance with Generally Accepted Auditing Standards." Stuart Hoegner, Tether's general counsel said "the bottom line is an audit cannot be obtained. The big four firms are anathema to that level of risk. We’ve gone for what we think is the next best thing."

Legal cases

New York Attorney General's case against iFinex 
On April 25, 2019, New York Attorney General Letitia James (prosecution) filed a lawsuit against iFinex (defendant)—the parent company of Tether Limited and the Bitfinex cryptocurrency exchange. The prosecution claimed that the Bitfinex cryptocurrency exchange had been unable to secure a reliable fiat banking relationship, so it had entrusted USD $1 billion to the Panamanian payment processing firm Crypto Capital Corp. The prosecution alleged that funds were co-mingled with corporate and client deposits and that no contract was ever signed with Crypto Capital. The prosecution speculated that Crypto Capital Corp had lost or stolen the money, and executives at Bitfinex and Tether Limited had been unable to recover up to USD $850 million of funds. The prosecution accused iFinex, Bitfinex, and Tether Limited of using Tether Limited to cover up the shortfall.

On April 26, 2019, iFinex contested claims that funds had been lost or stolen by Crypto Capital Corp, stating that funds had actually been seized and Bitfinex sought release of the funds. Crypto Capital Corp told Bitfinex the seizures were temporary and presented excuses as to why the funds could not be released to Bitfinex (Case Point 33). Crypto Capital Corp stated that: in May 2018, the government of Poland had frozen a Crypto Capital Corp bank account holding at least USD $340 million of Bitfinex funds (Case Point No. 33); and between April and July 2018, a Crypto Capital Corp account in Portugal containing around $150 million of Bitfinex funds had also been frozen (Case Point No. 34). The principals of Crypto Capital Corp were later arrested. During the case, iFinex contested claims that Tether Limited had been used to cover up alleged losses, stating that Bitfinex had borrowed USD $400 million from Tether Limited due to the inability to access seized funds from Crypto Capital Corp (Case Point No. 38). Bitfinex stated they had fully repaid the loans with interest to Tether Limited by February 5, 2021.

On May 16, 2021, New York Supreme Court Judge Joel M. Cohen granted iFinex's motion to modify the injunction because the New York Attorney General's office's accusations were too general and lacked specificity, stating the prosecution's case was "couched in exceedingly sweeping terms" and "injunctions must be specific." 

On February 17, 2021, iFinex settled the legal dispute with the New York Attorney General's office. iFinex, Bitfinex, and Tether Limited did not admit any wrongdoing and paid USD $18.5 million to settle the case.

U.S. Commodity Futures Trading Commission (CFTC) 
On December 5, 2017, the U.S. Commodity Futures Trading Commission (prosecution) issued subpoenas to Bitfinex and Tether Limited concerning the backing of minted USD₮. Before February 25, 2019, Tether Limited's terms claimed "Every tether is always backed 1-to-1, by traditional currency held in our reserves. So 1 USDT is always equivalent to 1 USD." After February 25, 2019, Tether Limited revised their terms to more accurately state "Tether Tokens are 100% backed by Tether’s Reserves" defined as "traditional currency and cash equivalents and, from time to time, may include other assets and receivables from loans made by Tether to third parties, which may include affiliated entities."

On April 30, 2019, iFinex (defendant)—the parent company of Tether Limited and the Bitfinex cryptocurrency exchange—issued an affidavit stating that minted USD₮ was 74% backed by a narrow definition of cash and cash equivalents, with the remaining 26% backed by other assets.

On October 15, 2021, Tether Limited paid a fine of USD $41.6 million for inaccurately claiming that minted USD₮ were 100% backed by fiat USD, when they were actually 100% backed by a combination of fiat USD and other assets such as "unsecured receivables, commercial papers, funds held by third parties, and other non-fiat assets". Tether Limited responded by revising their claims to state that "All Tether tokens are pegged at 1-to-1 with a matching fiat currency and are backed 100% by Tether’s reserves." Tether Limited released assurance reports from 2017 to 2022 attesting to the 100% backing of minted USD₮. In May 2021, Tether published a report showing that 2.9% of Tether was backed by fiat USD, with over 49.6% backed by commercial paper, and the remaining amount backed by other assets.

See also 
 USD Coin (USDC)
 Dai (DAI)
 Pax Dollar (USDP)
 Gemini Dollar (GUSD)

References

External links 
 

2014 establishments
Cryptocurrency projects
Currencies introduced in 2014
Ethereum tokens
Blockchains